Weronika Baszak (born 21 September 2002) is a Polish professional tennis player.

Baszak has a career-high ITF combined junior ranking of 39, achieved on 13 January 2020.

Junior career
Junior Grand Slam results - Singles:

 Australian Open: F (2020)
 French Open: 1R (2020)
 Wimbledon: 1R (2019)
 US Open: –

Junior Grand Slam results - Doubles:

 Australian Open: 2R (2020)
 French Open: 2R (2019)
 Wimbledon: 2R (2019)
 US Open: –

Junior Grand Slam finals

Singles: 1 (runner-up)

ITF Circuit finals

Doubles: 2 (1 title, 1 runner-up)

ITF Junior Circuit finals

Singles (7–5)

Doubles (10–8)

References

2002 births
Living people
Polish female tennis players
Sportspeople from Wrocław
21st-century Polish women